Trevor Kronemann and David Macpherson were the defending champions but lost in the semifinals to Mark Knowles and Daniel Nestor.

Brian MacPhie and Gary Muller won in the final 4–6, 7–6, 7–5 against Knowles and Nestor.

Seeds
Champion seeds are indicated in bold text while text in italics indicates the round in which those seeds were eliminated.

 Grant Connell /  Sébastien Lareau (first round)
 Mark Knowles /  Daniel Nestor (final)
 Rick Leach /  Jonathan Stark (semifinals)
 Trevor Kronemann /  David Macpherson (semifinals)

Draw

External links
 1997 Sybase Open Doubles draw

SAP Open
1997 ATP Tour